Josh Nathanial Allen (born December 30, 1991) is a former American football center. He played college football at the University of Louisiana at Monroe and attended Cedar Hill High School in Cedar Hill, Texas. He has been a member of the Tampa Bay Buccaneers, Green Bay Packers, San Francisco 49ers, Arizona Cardinals, Arizona Hotshots, and Dallas Renegades.

Early years
Allen played high school football for the Cedar Hill High School Longhorns. He earned first-team all-district honors in 2009 and was selected to play in the Team USA vs. World All-Star Game. He helped lead the Longhorns to the 2008 and 2009 district championships. Allen played tackle and center his senior year. He also lettered in powerlifting and track & field.

College career
Allen played for the Louisiana–Monroe Warhawks from 2010 to 2013.

Professional career

Tampa Bay Buccaneers
Allen signed with the Tampa Bay Buccaneers on May 12, 2014, after going undrafted in the 2014 NFL Draft. He was released by the Buccaneers on August 31, 2014.

Green Bay Packers
Allen was signed to the Green Bay Packers' practice squad on September 3, 2014. He was released by the Packers on September 23, 2014.

Tampa Bay Buccaneers (second stint)
Allen was signed to the Tampa Bay Buccaneers' practice squad on September 25, 2014. He was promoted to the active roster on November 29, 2014. He made his NFL debut on December 14, 2014, against the Carolina Panthers. Allen was cut by the Buccaneers on September 1, 2015. On September 2, 2015, he was placed on injured reserve. On September 9, 2015, he was waived from injured reserve. On November 18, 2015, Allen was signed to the Buccaneers' practice squad. On January 5, 2016, Allen signed a reserve/future contract with the Buccaneers.

On September 3, 2016, Allen was released by the Buccaneers as part of final roster cuts. The next day, he was signed to the Buccaneers' practice squad. He was promoted to the active roster on November 22, 2016. He was released on December 10, 2016.

San Francisco 49ers
Allen was claimed off waivers by the 49ers on December 12, 2016. He was released on December 21, 2016.

Tampa Bay Buccaneers (third stint)
On December 27, 2016, Allen was re-signed to the Buccaneers' practice squad. He signed a reserve/future contract with the Buccaneers on January 2, 2017. He was waived on September 2, 2017.

Calgary Stampeders
Allen was signed to the Calgary Stampeders' practice roster in October 2017.

Arizona Cardinals
On January 2, 2018, Allen signed a reserve/future contract with the Arizona Cardinals. He was waived on September 1, 2018.

Arizona Hotshots
In 2019, Allen joined the Arizona Hotshots of the Alliance of American Football. The league ceased operations in April 2019.

Dallas Renegades
Allen was drafted in the 6th round in phase two in the 2020 XFL Draft by the Dallas Renegades. He had his contract terminated when the league suspended operations on April 10, 2020.

References

External links
Think NFL life's fair? Josh Allen says 'hello'

Living people
1991 births
American football centers
Canadian football offensive linemen
African-American players of American football
African-American players of Canadian football
Players of American football from Dallas
Players of Canadian football from Dallas
Louisiana–Monroe Warhawks football players
Tampa Bay Buccaneers players
Green Bay Packers players
San Francisco 49ers players
Calgary Stampeders players
Arizona Cardinals players
Arizona Hotshots players
Dallas Renegades players
21st-century African-American sportspeople